Jansen is a Dutch/Flemish and Low German patronymic surname meaning son of Jan, a common derivative of Johannes. It is equivalent to the English surname Johnson. The near homonyms "Jensen" and "Jansson" are its Danish, Norwegian and Swedish counterparts.

Jansen is a very common surname in the Dutch-language area. Jansen is one of the most common names in the Netherlands and the most common when combined with variant spelling Janssen. In Belgium, the variant Janssens is the second most common name.

People named Jansen

Ada Jansen (born 1942), Dutch politician
Adam Jansen, American archivist
Alandson Jansen da Silva (born 1988), Belgian-Brazilian footballer
Alexandre Jansen Da Silva (born 1987), Belgian-Brazilian footballer
Alf-Inge Jansen (born 1939), Norwegian political scientist and politician
Amund Grøndahl Jansen (born 1994), Norwegian cyclist
Anco Jansen (born 1989), Dutch football forward 
Angela Jansen (born 1929), American artist
Annemiek Padt-Jansen (1921–2007), Dutch harpist and Labour Party politician
Arne Jansen (born 1975), German jazz guitarist
Astrid Jansen (born 1950s), Dutch figure skater
Barend Coenraad Petrus Jansen (1884–1962), Dutch chemist and biochemist
Bernt Jansen (table tennis) (born 1949), German table tennis player
Birger Jansen (1948–2016), Norwegian ice hockey player and sailor
Cas Jansen (born 1977), Dutch actor
Catherine Jansen (born 1950), American photographer
Chris Jansen (born 1966), Dutch politician
Cisita Joity Jansen (born 1990), Indonesian badminton player representing Germany
Ciska Jansen (born 1944), Dutch track and field athlete
Cornelius Jansen (1585–1638), Dutch theologian (Jansenism)
Cornelius Jansen (Bishop of Ghent) (1510–1576), Flemish religious leader (Jansen of Ghent)
Dan Jansen (born 1964), American speed skater
Dan Jansen (sledge hockey), Canadian ice sledge hockey player
Daniel Jansen (basketball) (born 1994), American basketball player
Daniel Jansen Van Doorn (born 1990), Canadian volleyball player
Danny Jansen (born 1995), American baseball player
Dave Jansen (born 1979), American mixed martial artist
David Jansen (born 1987), German football forward
DeWitt Clinton Jansen (1840–1894), American hotelier and politician and judge in Shanghai
Dolf Jansen (born 1963), Dutch comedian and radio presenter
Duan Jansen (born 2000), South African cricketer
Ea Jansen (1921–2005), Estonian historian
Eelco Jansen (born 1969), Dutch baseball player
Einar Jansen (1893–1960), Norwegian historian, genealogist and archivist
Ellen Jansen (born 1992), Dutch football forward
Emile Jansen (born 1959), Dutch television, film and theatre actor
Emily Jansen (born 1977), Australian amputee skier
Eric Jansen (born 2000), German footballer
Ernest George Jansen (1881–1959), South African politician
Ernst Jansen Steur (born 1945), Dutch neurologist
Eystein Jansen (born 1953), Norwegian marine geologist
Floor Jansen (born 1981), Dutch singer
Floris Jansen (born 1962), Dutch cricketer
 (1925–2001), Dutch comedian
Freek Jansen (born 1992), Dutch politician
 (born 1976), Dutch gymnast and television presenter
Gaite Jansen (born 1991), Dutch actress
Geert Jan Jansen (born 1943), Dutch art forger
George Jansen (fl. 1950s), American test pilot
 (born 1964), Dutch draughts player
Haakon Jansen (1900–1968), Norwegian long-distance runner
Hanneke Jansen (born c. 1970), Dutch computational chemist
 (born 1931), Dutch theologian and scholar of anti-semitism
Hans Jansen (1942–2015), Dutch politician and scholar of contemporary Islam
Hans-Jürgen Jansen (born 1941), German footballer
Harm Jansen (born 1967), Dutch racing cyclist
Harrie Jansen (born 1947), Dutch racing cyclist
Harry August Jansen (1883–1955), Danish-born American magician
Heinrich Jansen (1625–1667), Danish Baroque painter
Hermann Jansen (1869–1945), German urban planner
Hernán Jansen (born 1985), Venezuelan fencer
Huub Jansen (born 1962), Dutch cricket umpire
Irene Jansen (born 1983), Dutch singer
J. J. Jansen (born 1986), American football long snapper 
Jacques Jansen (1913–2002), French singer
Jacquin Jansen (born 1986), South African rugby player
Jan Jansen (cyclist) (born 1945), Dutch cyclist
Jan Jansen (historian) (born 1962), Dutch historian
Jan B. Jansen (1898–1984), Norwegian professor of medicine
Jan Helge Jansen (born 1937), Norwegian politician
Jan K. S. Jansen (1931–2011), Norwegian professor of medicine
Janine Jansen (born 1978), Dutch violinist
Jarrad Jansen (born 1995), Australian rules footballer
Jennette Jansen (born 1968), Dutch Paralympian
Jens Jonas Jansen (1844–1912), Norwegian priest 
Jochem Jansen (born 1990), Dutch football defender
Joeri Jansen (born 1979), Belgian middle-distance runner
Johan Jansen (born 1989), Dutch football goalkeeper
Johann Joseph Jansen (1825–1849), German socialist revolutionary
Johannes Jansen (1829–1891), German historian and priest
Johannes Jansen (mayor) (1665–1734), Mayor of New York City from 1725 to 1726
Johannes Henricus Gerardus Jansen (1868–1936), Dutch Archbishop
John Jansen (politician) (born 1947), Canadian (British Columbia) politician
John Jansen (record producer) (born 1947), American recording engineer and music producer
John Jansen (rugby league) (born 1955), Australian rugby league player
John Jansen (water polo) (born 1963), Dutch water polo player
Jon Jansen (born 1976), American football offensive tackle.
Jonas Jansen (1900–1975), Norwegian archivist
Jones Ralfy Jansen (born 1992), Indonesian badminton player
Jordan Jansen (born 1998), Australian pop singer
Jos Jansen (born 1954), Belgian rallycross driver
Karl Jansen (1908–1061), German weightlifter
Kathleen Jansen, American (Michigan) judge
Kati Jansen (born 1934), German freestyle swimmer
Kenley Jansen (born 1987), Dutch baseball player
Kevin Jansen (born 1992), Dutch football midfielder
Larry Jansen (1920–2009), American baseball player
Laura Jansen (born 1977), Dutch-born American singer-songwriter
Laura Jansen van Vuuren (born c.1958), South African Navy admiral
Lauren Jansen (born 1992), Australian basketball player
Leen Jansen (born 1930), Dutch boxer
Leo Jansen (1930–1980), Dutch painter
Leoni Jansen (born 1955), Dutch singer
Louise Mai Jansen (born 1984), Danish swimmer
Lynette Jansen, South African racing cyclist
Maarten Jansen (born 1952), Dutch archaeologist and Mesoamericanist
Mallory Jansen (born 1989), Australian actress
Marcell Jansen (born 1985), German footballer
Marco Jansen (born 2000), South African cricketer
Marco Jansen van Vuren (born 1996), South African rugby player 
Marcus Jansen (born 1968), American painter in Germany
Marie Jansen (1857–1914), American actress
Marijke Jansen (born 1944), Dutch tennis player
Marius Jansen (1922–2000), American Japanese history academic
Mark Jansen (born 1978), Dutch metal musician
Mark Jansen (politician), American (Michigan) politician
Marlon Jansen (born 1980), South African cricket umpire
Matt Jansen (born 1977), English footballer
Maximilian Jansen (born 1993), German footballer 
Maya Jansen (born 1994), American tennis player
Michael Jansen (born 1984), Dutch footballer
Michel Jansen (born 1966), Dutch football manager 
Misael Silva Jansen (born 1987), Brazilian football striker
Monifa Jansen (born 1993), Curaçaoan beauty pageant
Monique Jansen (born 1978), Dutch discus thrower
Nils Jansen (born 1959), Norwegian jazz musician
Paige Jansen-Nichols, American Jewelry designer and business executive
Patrick Jansen (1920–2003), Indian hockey player
Paulus Jansen (born 1954), Dutch politician
Per Jansen (born 1941), Norwegian stage and film actor
Peter Jansen (art educator) (born 1938), Dutch artist
Peter Jansen (politician) (1852–1923), American (Nebraska) politician
Peter Jansen (rower), New Zealand rower
Petter Jansen (born 1955), Norwegian business executive
Philip Jansen (born 1967), British businessman
Pierre Jansen (1930–2015), French film scores composer
Pieter Jansen (born 1995), South African rugby player
Pieter Jansen van Vuren (born 1991), South African rugby player
Querelle Jansen (born 1985), Dutch model
Quint Jansen (born 1990), Dutch footballer
Rassie Jansen van Vuuren (born 1985), South African rugby player
Ray Jansen (1889–1934), American baseball player
Renate Jansen (born 1990), Dutch football striker
Robbie Jansen (born 1949), South African musician
Rocco Jansen (born 1986), South African rugby player
Roeliff Jansen (1602–1637), Norwegian settler in New Netherland
Rogier Jansen (born 1984), Dutch basketball player 
Ronald Jansen (born 1963), Dutch hockey player
Ross Jansen (1932–2010), New Zealand politician, mayor of Hamilton
Roy Jansen (born 1950), Norwegian ice hockey player
Rudolf Jansen (born 1940), Dutch pianist
Rudy Jansen (born 1979), Dutch footballer
Sacharias Jansen (1585–1632), Dutch spectacle-maker associated with the invention of the telescope and microscope
Sandra Jansen (born 1963), Canadian (Alberta) politician
Sigurd Jansen (born 1932), Norwegian composer, pianist and conductor
Stefan Jansen (born 1972), Dutch footballer
Steve Jansen (born 1959), English musician, composer and record produce
Steve Jansen (soccer) (born 1967), Canadian soccer player
Susan Estelle Jansen, American television producer and writer
Tammy Jansen (born c.1975), American model
Theo Jansen (born 1948), Dutch artist
Theo Jansen van Rensburg (born 1967), South African rugby player
Therese Jansen Bartolozzi (ca.1770–1843), German pianist
 (born 1945), Dutch movie actor
Torsten Jansen (born 1976), German handballer
Torsten Stiig Jansen (born 1963), Danish journalist
Ulli Jansen (1931–2006), German ice hockey player
Uwe Jansen, German rugby league coach
Wim Jansen (1946–2022), Dutch footballer
Wolfgang Jansen (1938–1988), German actor
Yibbi Jansen (born 1999), Dutch field hockey player

As a patronym
Hendrik Jansen van Barrefelt (c. 1520 – c. 1594), Dutch Christian mystic
Peter Jansen Wessel Tordenskiold (1690–1720), Norwegian naval hero
Rutger Jansen Bleecker (1675–1756), Mayor of Albany, New York

Fictional characters
Cam Jansen, eponymic character of a mystery book series by David A. Adler
Tek Jansen, fictional character featured on The Colbert Report

See also
Janse
Janson
Janssen
Janssens

References
Ana Jansen (page in Portuguese)

Dutch-language surnames
Norwegian-language surnames
Patronymic surnames
Surnames from given names